Gabon competed at the 2020 Summer Paralympics in Tokyo, Japan, from 24 August to 5 September 2021. This was their fourth consecutive appearance at the Summer Paralympics since 2008.

Competitors
The following is the list of number of competitors participating in the Games:

Athletics 

Men's track

Women's field

See also 
 Gabon at the Paralympics
 Gabon at the 2020 Summer Olympics

External links 
 Paralympics website 

Nations at the 2020 Summer Paralympics
2020
Summer Paralympics